Mest is the fourth studio album by the pop punk band Mest. It was released in 2003 on Maverick Records. From June to August 2003, the group went on the 2003 edition of Warped Tour. "Jaded (These Years)" was released to radio on July 1, 2003. The album peaked at #64 on the Billboard 200.

Track listing
 "Until I Met You" (Lovato/Madden) – 3:02
 "Rooftops" (Lovato) – 3:54
 "Jaded (These Years)" featuring Benji Madden (Lovato/Madden/Feldmann) – 3:10
 "Night Alone" (Rangel) – 3:29
 "Burning Bridges" (Lovato) – 3:30
 "Walking on Broken Glass" (Feldmann/Lovato) – 3:35
 "Your Promise" (Feldmann/Rangel) – 3:15
 "2000 Miles" (Lovato) – 2:48
 "Shell of Myself" (Rangel) – 3:47
 "Lost, Broken, Confused" (Lovato) – 2:51
 "Chance of a Lifetime" (Feldmann/Lovato) – 3:09
 "Return to Self-Loathing" (Feldmann/Rangel) – 3:55
 "Paradise (122nd and Highland)"/25 to Life (Hidden Track) (Feldmann/Lovato) – 8:34

Japan bonus tracks
 "Got to Go"
 "Cadillac" (live)

References

Mest albums
2003 albums
Maverick Records albums
Albums produced by John Feldmann